Taekwondo took place from October 10 to October 13 at the 2002 Asian Games in Busan, South Korea. Men's and women's competitions held in eight weight categories for each. All competition took place at the Gudeok Gymnasium. Each country except the host nation was limited to having 6 men and 6 women.

Schedule

Medalists

Men

Women

Medal table

Participating nations
A total of 219 athletes from 35 nations competed in taekwondo at the 2002 Asian Games:

References
2002 Asian Games Official Report, Pages 718–733

External links
Official website

 
2002 Asian Games events
Asian Games
2002